District Hospital Pulwama is one of the oldest Hospitals in Jammu and Kashmir. It was opened in 1959.it is Located on Srinagar-Nowgam Highway.District Hospital Pulwama is Main Critical Care Hospital for Both Pulwama and Shopian Districts Nowadays, it has also 5 PG Departments.

References 

Hospitals in India
Hospitals in Jammu and Kashmir